Paul Kroegel  (January 9, 18641948) was a German immigrant to the United States who helped establish Pelican Island as a bird sanctuary in Florida. Kroegel is listed as a Great Floridian.

Kroegel was born in Chemnitz, Germany.  He arrived in Sebastian, Florida in 1881 and homesteaded with his brother, Arthur, and their father Gottlieb Kroegel, on a shell midden on the west bank of the Indian River Lagoon overlooking Pelican Island. The island consisted of a five-acres of mangrove where thousands of brown pelicans and other water birds would roost and nest. Kroegel protected the island's avian inhabitants with his shotgun and would stand guard at a time when neither state nor federal laws protected the animals.

Influential naturalists visited and stayed at the nearby Oak Lodge from the 1880s to the early 1900s, including ornithologist Frank Chapman (ornithologist) (curator at the American Museum of Natural History in New York. In 1901, the American Ornithologists' Union and the Florida Audubon Society led efforts to pass legislation in Florida calling for the protection of non-game birds. Kroegel was one of four wardens hired by the Florida Audubon Society to protect water birds from market hunters. Two of the wardens were murdered doing this work.

Additional protections were granted by president Theodore Roosevelt who signed an executive order on 14 March 1903, establishing Pelican Island as the first federal bird reservation, part of a network of 55 bird reservation and national game preserved for wildlife that were forerunners to the national wildlife refuge system. Kroegel was hired as the first national wildlife refuge manager until 1926. He was paid $1 per month by the Audubon Society, as Congress had not made financial provisions for the refuge.

He was a founding member of the St. Lucie County Board of Commissioners in 1905.

He died in Sebastian, Florida in 1948.

References

1864 births
1948 deaths
American conservationists
County commissioners in Florida
Florida pioneers
German emigrants to the United States
People from Chemnitz
People from Sebastian, Florida